Sean Moore may refer to:

Seán Moore (Irish politician) (1913–1986), Irish Fianna Fáil politician
Seán Moore (Gaelic footballer)
Sean Moore (musician) (born 1968), musician with the Welsh rock band Manic Street Preachers
Sean A. Moore (1965–1998), American fantasy and science fiction writer
Seann Miley Moore, singer
Sean Moore (footballer), Northern Irish footballer

See also
Shawn Moore, American football player